"Por Qué Será" ("Why Will That Be?") is a song written, produced, and performed by Italo-Venezuelan singer-songwriter Rudy La Scala. It was released as the lead single from Scala's fifth studio album of the same title (1991), and became his second No. 1 single in the Billboard Top Latin Songs chart following "El Cariño Es Como Una Flor" the previous year.

The song debuted in the Billboard Top Latin Songs chart (formerly Hot Latin Tracks) chart at No. 22 in the week of September 14, 1991, climbing to the top ten four weeks later. "Por Qué Será" peaked at No. 1 on November 9, 1991, replacing "Cosas del Amor" by American singer Vikki Carr and Mexican singer-songwriter Ana Gabriel and being succeeded two weeks later by "Amor Mío, ¿Qué Me Has Hecho?" by Spanish singer-songwriter Camilo Sesto.

See also
Billboard Top Latin Songs Year-End Chart
List of number-one Billboard Hot Latin Tracks of 1991

References

1991 singles
1991 songs
Rudy La Scala songs
Songs written by Rudy La Scala
Spanish-language songs
Rodven Records singles
1990s ballads
Pop ballads